Clifton Rhodes Bratcher (December 23, 1917 – July 25, 1977) was a United States district judge of the United States District Court for the Western District of Kentucky.

Education and career

Born in Morgantown, Kentucky, Bratcher was a Sergeant in the United States Army during World War II, from 1941 to 1945, and then received a Bachelor of Laws from the University of Louisville School of Law in 1947. He was the county attorney of Butler County in Morgantown, Kentucky from 1950 to 1953. He was a Chief Assistant United States Attorney for the Western District of Kentucky from 1953 to 1955, thereafter entering private practice in Owensboro, Kentucky from 1956 to 1970.

Federal judicial service

On October 7, 1970, Bratcher was nominated by President Richard Nixon to a new seat on the United States District Court for the Western District of Kentucky created by 84 Stat. 294. He was confirmed by the United States Senate on October 13, 1970, and received his commission on October 16, 1970. He served as Chief Judge from 1976 until his death on July 25, 1977.

References

Sources
 

1917 births
1977 deaths
Judges of the United States District Court for the Western District of Kentucky
United States district court judges appointed by Richard Nixon
20th-century American judges
United States Army soldiers
People from Morgantown, Kentucky
20th-century American lawyers
Assistant United States Attorneys
United States Army personnel of World War II